UGL, formerly known as United Group, is an engineering company. The company provides construction, maintenance, and asset management services to the rail, resources, and infrastructure sectors, and corporate real estate, facilities management, and business process outsourcing services to property users. Its clients are large companies, governments and institutions in Australia, New Zealand, Asia. It was purchased by the CIMIC Group in December 2016.

History
UGL was founded as an engineering construction firm in Perth, Western Australia in 1970 by Charlie Bontempo, Sam Castelli, John Rubino & John Trettel. In 1988, it was re-branded as the United Construction Group.

UGL has acquired a number of businesses, including engineering, construction, and facilities management business Kilpatrick Green in 1998, rail company Goninan in 1999, corporate real estate business KFPW in 2002, Thames Water Projects Asia in 2004, Singaporean real estate services company Premas International (UGL Premas) and Alstom's Australian and New Zealand transport and rail businesses in 2005, Chicago-based Equis Corporation (UGL Equis) and Canberra-based Peak Security in 2006, and Boston-based Unicco Services Company (UGL Unicco) in 2007.

In 2011, a commercial real estate firm DTZ was acquired, but was sold in 2014 to a consortium of TPG Capital, PAG Asia Capital and the Ontario Teachers' Pension Plan.

In October 2016, CIMIC Group launched a successful takeover offer for the company, with CIMIC applying in December 2016 to compulsorily acquire all remaining shares.

Timeline
1994 – Listed on the Australian Securities Exchange as United Construction
1997 – Changed company name to United Group Limited
1998 – Acquisition of Kilpatrick Green
1999 – Acquisition of Goninan
2002 – Acquisition of KFPW from Knight Frank & PwC
2004 – Acquisition of Thames Water Projects Asia from Thames Water
2005 – Acquisition of Premas, and the Australian & New Zealand operations of Alstom 
2006 – Acquisition of Equis, Fischer Industries, Goulburn Railway Workshops, Peak Security and Steelplan
2007 – Acquisition of Proactive Communication Solutions and Unicco
2009 – Changed company name to UGL Limited
2011 – Acquisition of DTZ
2014 – Disposal of DTZ
2016 – Taken over by CIMIC Group

References

External links
Company website

Companies based in Sydney
Companies formerly listed on the Australian Securities Exchange
Construction and civil engineering companies established in 1970
Australian companies established in 1970
2016 mergers and acquisitions
Engineering companies of Australia